Papuan Pidgin English was a 19th-century English-based pidgin of New Guinea.  It was eventually replaced by Hiri Motu, a Melanesian-based pidgin, and was not ancestral to modern English-based Tok Pisin.

References

English-based pidgins and creoles
Extinct languages of Oceania
Languages of New Guinea